Legislative Assembly elections were held in Himachal Pradesh in 2003.

Results

Source: ECI

Elected members

See also
10th Himachal Pradesh Assembly

References

External links
 Chief Electoral Officer, Himachal Pradesh

 State Assembly elections in Himachal Pradesh
2000s in Himachal Pradesh
Himachal